It Is Never Too Late to Love (Spanish: Nunca es tarde para amar) is a 1953 Mexican drama film directed by Tito Davison and starring Libertad Lamarque, Roberto Cañedo and José Elías Moreno.

Partial cast
 Libertad Lamarque as Malisa Morales 
 Roberto Cañedo as Claudio Pérez de Castro  
 José Elías Moreno as Doctor Zamora  
 José Baviera as Señor Rodríguez  
 Dolores Tinoco as Rosario  
 Jesús Valero as Lic. Bustamante 
 Andrés Velázquez as Quique  
 Martha Valdés as Amelia

References

Bibliography 
 María Luisa Amador. Cartelera cinematográfica, 1950-1959. UNAM, 1985.

External links 
 

1953 films
1953 drama films
Mexican drama films
1950s Spanish-language films
Films directed by Tito Davison
Mexican black-and-white films
1950s Mexican films